Antonino Dos Santos Baptista (10 March 1933 – 5 February 2013) was a Portuguese professional racing cyclist. He rode in three editions of the Tour de France.

References

External links
 

1933 births
2013 deaths
Portuguese male cyclists
People from Águeda
Sportspeople from Aveiro District